Guy III of Châtillon, Count of Saint-Pol (died 1289) was a French nobleman, and was a younger son of Hugh I, Count of Blois, and Mary, Countess of Blois.

While his elder brother John I of Châtillon succeeded to their mother's County of Blois, Guy was given their father's county of Saint-Pol-sur-Ternoise at his death in 1248.

On January 16, 1255, he married Matilda of Brabant, Countess of Artois, daughter of Henry II, Duke of Brabant and Marie of Hohenstaufen, and thereafter was a supporter of his brother-in-law Henry III against Guelders. They had:
 Hugh II, Count of Blois.
 Guy IV, Count of Saint-Pol.
 Jacques, lord of Leuze-Châtillon.
 Beatrix (d. 1304), married John I of Brienne, Count of Eu
 Jeanne, married Guillaume III de Chauvigny, Lord of Châteauroux

He joined the Eighth Crusade (1270) and the ill-fated Crusade of Aragón of Philip III of France.

References

Chatillon, Guy III of
Saint Pol, Guy II de Chatillon, comte de
Saint Pol, Guy II de Chatillon, comte de
1289 deaths
Year of birth unknown
House of Châtillon